Paul Koloi (born 25 December 1972) is a Tongan rugby league footballer who represented Tonga in the 2000 World Cup.

Playing career
A Riccarton-Lincoln junior in the Canterbury Rugby League, Koloi played for the Canterbury Cardinals in the 1995 and 1996 Lion Red Cups. He played for Tonga in the 1996 Pacific Challenge.

Koloi was signed by the Wigan Warriors in 1997 on a two-year deal. However he was released at the end of his first season.

In 1998 Koloi returned to Riccarton-Lincoln and again represented Canterbury.

He made his debut for Tonga in 1999 and was included in their 2000 World Cup squad where he played in three matches. In 2000 he was playing for Mackay in Queensland.

In 2003 he returned to England, joining the London Skolars.

References

Living people
Tongan rugby league players
Tonga national rugby league team players
1972 births
Wigan Warriors players
Canterbury rugby league team players
London Skolars players
Mackay Cutters players
Riccarton Knights players
Rugby league fullbacks
Rugby league centres